Apache Nitrogen Products purchased land in 1925, to provide housing for company management, from the Benson School District on West 6th Street in Benson, about  north of the plant. Eight individual lots were sold to company officials, who had houses built (by unknown contractors). After a disagreement, the company purchased the lots back and then rented them to the employees at subsidized rates. Apache also build an "evacuation hospital" at 209 West 6th St. The company owned the properties for many decades, eventually selling them in the 1970s and 80s. A  parcel on the north side of the street was used as a park and legally transferred in the 1960s by the company to the City of Benson.

The eight houses, the hospital building, and the park were designated as the Apache Powder Historic Residential District and listed on the National Register of Historic Places in 1994. Seven of the houses are in the Craftsman Bungalow architectural style, the dominate style of the district. The style was popular in the Benson area in the mid-1920s. All but one are stuccoed with wood-sided gable ends. One is entirely wood-sided. All have detached garages opening to an alley, hardwood flooring, and were built on redwood piers over a crawl space. One other house is Spanish Colonial Revival and Mission Revival style with stucco, stepped parapets, and an articulated porch, and originally served as an hospital for the company. The final building in the historic district is Spanish Eclectic with influences of Moorish, Byzantine, Gothic, and Renaissance architecture.

The district is considered "architecturally significant" for representing popular architectural styles at the time of Apache Powder's early history and association with the company, which is a significant part of Benson's history. The company brought important employment and economic stimulus to Benson.

Contributing properties 
All the houses were built . The exact dates and builders are not known.

Map

References

External links

National Register of Historic Places in Cochise County, Arizona
Buildings and structures completed in 1925
Historic districts in Arizona